Charlotte Small (September 1, 1785 - May 4, 1857) was a Métis woman who notably joined her surveyor, map maker, and explorer husband David Thompson on his expeditions.

Life 
Charlotte Small was born on September 1, 1785 to North West Company investor-partner Patrick Small and an unnamed Cree woman. Her siblings were also involved in the fur trade; Patrick Small Jr. was a North West Company clerk and Nancy Small was the first wife of North West Company partner, John MacDonald of Garth.

Small married surveyor, map maker, and explorer David Thompson on 10 June 1799 at Île-à-la-Crosse, Saskatchewan. The two had 13 children, with whom Small often travelled to accompany Thompson on his expeditions ranging from the Rockies to Quebec. Small travelled 3½ times farther on these expeditions with Thompson than did the American explorers Lewis and Clark.

When Thompson wrote in his journal "Today wed Charlotte Small", few could have imagined just how long he would honour that commitment. At a time when European explorers and traders were abandoning their wives and children for lives and families in Canada or Europe, Thompson remained faithful to the promise he had made, staying by the side of "his lovely wife" and providing for her and their 13 children. The couple were married for 58 years until Thompson's death in 1857. Small died a few months later on May 4, 1857. They are buried together at Mount Royal Cemetery, Montreal, Quebec, Canada.

References

Works
"Moccasin Miles - The Travels of Charlotte Small Thompson 1799–1812" Contemporary and Historical Maps: Charlotte Small (S. Leanne Playter & Andreas N. Korsos|Publisher: Arcturus Consulting)
"Thompson in Alberta 1787–1812"; "David Thompson on the Columbia River 1807–1812"; "The Explorations and Travels of David Thompson 1784–1812"; "Posts and Forts of the North American Fur Trade 1600–1870" Contemporary and Historical Maps: David Thompson (Andreas N. Korsos|Publisher: Arcturus Consulting)

External links
Contemporary and Historical Maps Maps depicting Charlotte Small's travels, David Thompson's travels, Posts and Forts of the Canadian Fur Trade 1600–1870, and other explorations (Published Arcturus Consulting)

Parks Canada - Charlotte Small, Person of National Historic Significance

1785 births
1857 deaths
Canadian fur traders
Persons of National Historic Significance (Canada)
Canadian Métis people
Métis fur traders
Indigenous women of the Americas